Stagecoach is a 1939 American Western film directed by John Ford and starring Claire Trevor and John Wayne in his breakthrough role. The screenplay by Dudley Nichols is an adaptation of "The Stage to Lordsburg", a 1937 short story by Ernest Haycox. The film follows a group of strangers riding on a stagecoach through dangerous Apache territory.

The film has long been recognized as an important work that transcends the Western genre. Philosopher Robert B. Pippin has observed that both the collection of characters and their journey "are archetypal rather than merely individual" and that the film is a "mythic representation of the American aspiration toward a form of politically meaningful equality." In 1995, the film was deemed "culturally, historically, or aesthetically significant" by the United States Library of Congress and selected for preservation in their National Film Registry. Still, Stagecoach has not avoided controversy. Like most Westerns of the era, its depiction of Native Americans as simplistic savages has been criticized.

Stagecoach was the first of many Westerns that Ford shot in Monument Valley, on the Arizona–Utah border in the American Southwest. Many of the movies Ford shot there also starred John Wayne. Scenes from Stagecoach, including a sequence introducing John Wayne's character the Ringo Kid, blended shots of Monument Valley with shots filmed on the Iverson Movie Ranch in Chatsworth, California, RKO Encino Movie Ranch, and other locations. Geographic incongruities are visible throughout the film, including the closing scene where Ringo (Wayne) and Dallas (Trevor) depart Lordsburg, in southwestern New Mexico, by way of Monument Valley.

Plot

In June 1880, a group of strangers boards the stagecoach from Tonto, Arizona Territory, to Lordsburg, New Mexico. Among them are Dallas, a prostitute driven out of town by the "Law and Order League"; the alcoholic Doc Boone; pregnant Lucy Mallory, who is travelling to join her cavalry officer husband; and whiskey salesman Samuel Peacock.

Buck, the stage driver, looks for his shotgun guard, and Marshal Curley Wilcox tells him that the guard is off searching for the Ringo Kid.  Ringo has broken out of prison after hearing that his father and brother were murdered by Luke Plummer. Buck tells Curley that Ringo is heading for Lordsburg. Knowing that Ringo has vowed vengeance, Curley decides to ride the stage as guard.

As the stagecoach sets out, U.S. Cavalry Lieutenant Blanchard announces that Geronimo and his Apaches are on the warpath, and that the small cavalry troop will provide an escort to Dry Fork. Upon seeing her distress, gambler and Southern gentleman Hatfield offers his protection to Mrs. Mallory and climbs aboard. At the edge of town Henry Gatewood, a banker absconding with embezzled money, flags down the stage and joins the passengers.

Further along the road, the stage comes across the Ringo Kid, stranded when his horse went lame. Though Curley and Ringo are friends, Curley takes Ringo into custody and crowds him into the coach. When they reach Dry Fork, they learn the expected cavalry detachment has gone on to Apache Wells. Buck wants to turn back, but most of the party votes to proceed. The group is taken aback when Ringo invites Dallas to sit at the main table for lunch. As they are eating Hatfield reveals that he served in the Confederate Army under the command of Mrs. Mallory's father in Virginia.

At Apache Wells, Mrs. Mallory learns that her husband had been wounded in battle with the Apaches. When she faints and goes into labor, Doc Boone sobers up and delivers the baby with Dallas assisting. Later that night, Ringo asks Dallas to marry him and live on a ranch he owns in Mexico.  Afraid to reveal her past, she does not answer immediately. The next morning, she accepts, but does not want to leave Mrs. Mallory and the new baby, so she tells Ringo to go on alone to his ranch, where she will meet him later. As Ringo is escaping, he sees smoke signals heralding an Apache attack and returns to custody.

The stage reaches Lee's Ferry, which the Apaches have destroyed. Curley uncuffs Ringo to help lash logs to the stagecoach and float it across the river. Just when they think the danger has passed, Apaches attack. A long chase follows, where some of the party are injured fighting off their pursuers. Just as they run out of ammunition and Hatfield is getting ready to save Mrs. Mallory from capture by killing her with his last bullet, he himself is mortally wounded. The 6th U.S. Cavalry rides to the rescue.

At Lordsburg Gatewood the banker is arrested by the local sheriff and Mrs. Mallory learns that her husband's wound is not serious. She thanks Dallas, who gives Mrs. Mallory her shawl. Dallas then begs Ringo not to confront the Plummers, but he is determined to settle matters. As they walk through town, he sees the brothel to which she is returning. Luke Plummer, who is playing poker in one of the saloons, hears of Ringo's arrival and gets his brothers to join him in a gunfight to kill Ringo.

Ringo survives the three-against-one shootout that follows, then surrenders to Curley, expecting to go back to prison. As Ringo boards a wagon, Curley invites Dallas to ride with them to the edge of town; but when she does so Curley and Doc stampede the horses, letting Ringo ride off with Dallas to his ranch across the border.

Cast

 Claire Trevor as Dallas
 John Wayne as Ringo Kid
 Andy Devine as Buck
 John Carradine as Hatfield
 Thomas Mitchell as Doc Boone
 Louise Platt as Lucy Mallory
 George Bancroft as Marshal Curley Wilcox
 Donald Meek as Samuel Peacock
 Berton Churchill as Henry Gatewood
 Tim Holt as Lieutenant Blanchard
 Tom Tyler as Luke Plummer

Uncredited:
 Chief John Big Tree as Apache scout
 Yakima Canutt as Cavalry scout
 Nora Cecil as Boone's landlady
 Francis Ford as Sergeant Billy Pickett
 Brenda Fowler as Mrs. Gatewood
 William Hopper as Sergeant
 Duke R. Lee as Lordsburg sheriff
 Chris-Pin Martin as Chris, innkeeper
 Vester Pegg as Hank Plummer
 Jack Pennick as Jerry, barkeeper in Tonto
 Joe Rickson as Ike Plummer
 Elvira Ríos as Yakima, Chris's Apache wife
 White Horse as Apache chief

Production

Development
The screenplay is an adaptation by Dudley Nichols of "The Stage to Lordsburg," a short story by Ernest Haycox. The rights to "Lordsburg" were bought by John Ford soon after it was published in Collier's magazine on April 10, 1937. According to Thomas Schatz, Ford claimed that his inspiration in expanding Stagecoach beyond the bare-bones plot given in "The Stage to Lordsburg" was his familiarity with another short story, "Boule de Suif" by Guy de Maupassant, although Schatz believes "this scarcely holds up to scrutiny". Ford's statement also seems to be the basis for the claim that Haycox himself relied upon Guy de Maupassant's story. However, there appears to be no concrete evidence for Haycox actually being familiar with the earlier story, especially as he was documented as going out of his way to avoid reading the work of others that might unconsciously influence his writing, and he focused his personal reading in the area of history.

Before production, Ford shopped the project around to several Hollywood studios, all of which turned him down because big budget Westerns were out of vogue, and because Ford insisted on using John Wayne in the key role in the film. Independent producer David O. Selznick finally agreed to produce it, but was frustrated by Ford's indecision about when shooting would begin, and had his own doubts over the casting. Ford withdrew the film from Selznick's company and approached independent producer Walter Wanger about the project. Wanger had the same reservations about producing an "A" western and even more about one starring John Wayne. Ford had not directed a western since the silent days. Wanger said he would not risk his money unless Ford replaced John Wayne with Gary Cooper and brought in Marlene Dietrich to play Dallas.

Ford refused to budge; it would be Wayne or no one. Eventually they compromised, with Wanger putting up $250,000, a little more than half of what Ford had been seeking, and Ford would give top billing to Claire Trevor, better known than John Wayne at the time.

Filming

The members of the production crew were billeted in Kayenta, in Northeastern Arizona, in an old CCC camp.   Conditions were spartan, production hours long, and weather conditions at this 5700 foot elevation were extreme with constant strong winds and low temperatures.  Nonetheless,  director John Ford was satisfied with the crew's location work.  For this location, filming took place near Goulding's Trading Post on the Utah border, about 25 miles from Kayenta. Scenes were filmed in Monument Valley locations as well as the Iverson Movie Ranch and the RKO Encino Movie Ranch. Stagecoach was the first of many Westerns that Ford shot using Monument Valley as a location, many of which also starred John Wayne. Anatopic incongruencies of landscape and vegetation are thus evident throughout the film, up to the closing scene of Ringo and Dallas departing Lordsburg, in the Chihuahuan Desert of southwestern New Mexico, by way of the unmistakable topography of Monument Valley's Colorado Plateau location.

Reception
 The film was released on 2 March 1939, and Ford's faith in John Wayne was rewarded. The film met with immediate critical and trade paper praise, and made a profit of $297,690.  Cast member Louise Platt, in a letter recounting the experience of the film's production, quoted Ford on saying of Wayne's future in film: "He'll be the biggest star ever because he is the perfect 'everyman'".

Stagecoach has been lauded as one of the most influential films ever made. Orson Welles argued that it was a perfect textbook of film-making and claimed to have watched it more than 40 times in preparation for the making of Citizen Kane. In 1995, the film was deemed "culturally, historically, or aesthetically significant" by the United States Library of Congress and selected for preservation in their National Film Registry.

The film has also been recognized as transcending the Western genre. Robert B. Pippin has observed that both the collection of characters and their journey "are archetypal rather than merely individual" and that the film is a "mythic representation of the American aspiration toward a form of politically meaningful equality." Nevertheless, its depiction of Native Americans is not above criticism. Writing in 2011, Roger Ebert noted that "The film's attitudes toward Native Americans are unenlightened. The Apaches are seen simply as murderous savages; there is no suggestion the white men have invaded their land. Ford shared that simple view with countless other makers of Westerns, and if it was crude in 1939 it was even more so as late as The Searchers (1956)."

Awards and honors

Academy Awards
Wins
 Best Supporting Actor – Thomas Mitchell
 Best Music (Scoring) – Richard Hageman, W. Franke Harling, John Leipold, Leo Shuken

Nominations
 Best Picture
 Best Director – John Ford
 Best Art Direction – Alexander Toluboff
 Best Cinematography (Black-and-White) – Bert Glennon
 Best Film Editing – Otho Lovering, Dorothy Spencer

Others
 John Ford won the 1939 New York Film Critics Circle Awards for Best Director. Other critics gave the film uniformly glowing reviews.
 In June 1998, the American Film Institute published its "AFI's 100 Years...100 Movies"—the 100 best American films, in the judgement of over 1,500 movie industry artists and leaders, who selected from a list of 400 nominated films. They ranked Stagecoach as #63 of the 100 best.
 In June 2008, the American Film Institute revealed its "Ten Top Ten"—the best ten films in ten "classic" American Western film genres—after polling over 1,500 people from the creative community. Stagecoach was acknowledged as the ninth best film in the western genre.

Re-releases and restoration
The film was originally released through United Artists, but under the terms of its seven-year-rights rule, the company surrendered distribution rights to producer Walter Wanger in 1946. Many independent companies were responsible for this film in the years since. The film's copyright (originally by Walter Wanger Productions) was renewed by 20th Century Fox, who produced a later 1966 remake of Stagecoach. The rights to the original 1939 film were subsequently acquired by Time-Life Films during the 1970s. The copyright has since been reassigned to Wanger Productions through the late producer's family under the Caidin Trust/Caidin Film Company, the ancillary rights holder. However, distribution rights are now held by Shout! Factory, which in 2014 acquired Jumer Productions/Westchester Films (which in turn had bought the Caidin Film holdings after the folding of former distributor Castle Hill Productions). Warner Bros. Pictures handles sales and additional distribution.

The original negative of Stagecoach was either lost or destroyed. Wayne had one positive print that had never been through a projector gate that director Peter Bogdanovich noticed in Wayne's garage while visiting. In 1970, Wayne allowed it to be used to produce a new negative and that is the film seen today at film festivals. UCLA fully restored the film in 1996 from surviving elements and premiered it on cable's American Movie Classics network. The previous DVD releases by Warner Home Video did not contain the restored print but rather a video print held in the Castle Hill/Caidin Trust library. A digitally restored Blu-ray/DVD version was released in May 2010 via The Criterion Collection.

Lone Ranger radio play 
The theme of the movie has been reproduced as a Lone Ranger radio episode "The Last Coach West", which played August 22, 1945. Most main characters in the movie had a counter-part in the radio play.

With these character replacements, the plot of the radio play paralleled that of the movie quite closely, with exception of the Lone Ranger and Tonto characters. They acted as heroes in saving the stagecoach occupants from the attacks of Geronimo's warrior Indians.
	
The radio play run time was only about 22 minutes, which is relatively short compared to 96 minutes of the movie. Consequently, character and plot development had to be accelerated, which resulted in weakening the motivation for certain events. For example, the uprising of Geronimo's warriors posed a wide-area threat to many towns and homes in the area, but the Lone Ranger somehow focused on the threat to a single stagecoach that was about to leave a certain town.

Remakes

Radio
 The May 4, 1946 radio episode of Academy Award Theater had Claire Trevor reprise her role alongside Randolph Scott.
 The December 7, 1946, radio episode of Hollywood Star Time presented Stagecoach, adapted by Milton Geiger.
 The January 9, 1949 radio episode of Screen Directors Playhouse had John Wayne and Claire Trevor both reprise their parts.

Film
 The 1966 remake of Stagecoach stars (in alphabetical order) Ann-Margret as Dallas, Red Buttons as the whiskey drummer, Mike Connors as the gambler, Alex Cord as the Ringo Kid, Bing Crosby as Doc Boone, Robert Cummings as the embezzler, Van Heflin as the Marshal, Slim Pickens as Buck, Stefanie Powers as Lucy, and Keenan Wynn as Luke Plummer.

Television
 A 1986 television version features Willie Nelson as Doc Holliday, Kris Kristofferson as the Ringo Kid, Johnny Cash as the Marshal, Waylon Jennings as Hatfield, Tony Franciosa as the embezzler, John Schneider as Buck, Anthony Newley as the whiskey drummer, Elizabeth Ashley as Dallas, Mary Crosby as Lucy, June Carter Cash as Mrs. Pickett, and Jessi Colter as Martha.

See also
 John Wayne filmography
 List of films with a 100% rating on Rotten Tomatoes, a film review aggregator website
List of films considered the best

References

External links

 Stagecoach essay by Scott Allen Nollen at National Film Registry
 Stagecoach essay by Danel Eagan in America's Film Legacy: The Authoritative Guide to the Landmark Movies in the National Film Registry, A&C Black, 2010 , pages 282-284
 Stagecoach Movie Booklet
 
 
 
 
 
 Review of Stagecoach at TVGuide.com
 Stage to Lordsburg by Ernest Haycox
 Literature on Stagecoach
 Stagecoach: Taking the Stage an essay by David Cairns at the Criterion Collection
 Movie Locations used in Stagecoach (1939)
 Stagecoach Stills and Cast Letters

Streaming
 
 Academy Award - Single Episodes on Academy Award Theater: May 4, 1946
 Stagecoach on Screen Directors Playhouse: January 9, 1949

1939 films
American black-and-white films
1939 Western (genre) films
American Western (genre) films
Apache Wars films
Films directed by John Ford
Films produced by Walter Wanger
Films with screenplays by Dudley Nichols
Films featuring a Best Supporting Actor Academy Award-winning performance
Films that won the Best Original Score Academy Award
Films scored by John Leipold
Films set in 1880
Films set in New Mexico
Films shot in Arizona
Films shot in Utah
United Artists films
United States National Film Registry films
Films based on short fiction
1930s English-language films
1930s American films
Films shot in Monument Valley